is a city located in Kumamoto Prefecture, Japan.

The modern city of Aso was established on February 11, 2005, from the merger of the former town of Aso, absorbing the town of Ichinomiya, and the village of Namino (all from Aso District).

As of March 31, 2017, the city has an estimated population of 27,039, with 11,355 households and a population density of 72 persons per km2. The total area is 376.25 km2.

The city is situated within Aso Caldera. The source of the Kikuchi River is located in the city.

Geography

Climate
Aso has a humid subtropical climate (Köppen climate classification Cfa) with hot, humid summers and cool winters. There is significant precipitation throughout the year, especially during June and July.

Demographics
Per Japanese census data, the population of Aso in 2020 is 24,930 people. Aso has been conducting censuses since 1920.

Tourism

Places of interest
Aso Geopark
Aso Kujū National Park
Mount Aso
Mount Aso Ropeway
Aso Volcano Museum
Aso Uchinomaki Spa 
Aso Akamizu Spa 
Sensuikyo 

Sensuikyo Ropeway (cable car) 
Aso Shrine

Notable people

Fictional characters born in Aso
Misae Nohara (born in Aso, Kumamoto, née Koyama).

Tomohiko Amada (from Killing Commendatore by Haruki Murakami)

References

External links

 Aso City official website 

 
Cities in Kumamoto Prefecture